4-methylaminobutanoate oxidase (formaldehyde-forming) (mabO (gene)) is an enzyme with systematic name 4-methylaminobutanoate:oxygen oxidoreductase (formaldehyde-forming). This enzyme catalyses the following chemical reaction

 4-methylaminobutanoate + O2 + H2O  4-aminobutanoate + formaldehyde + H2O2

This enzyme is a flavoprotein (FAD).

References

External links 
 

EC 1.5.3